Tash Lonsdale (born 25 October 1977 in Werribee, Victoria) is an Australian sport shooter. She competed at the 2000 Summer Olympics in the women's skeet event, in which she placed fourth.

References

1977 births
Living people
Skeet shooters
Australian female sport shooters
Shooters at the 2000 Summer Olympics
Olympic shooters of Australia
People from Werribee, Victoria
Sportspeople from Melbourne
Sportswomen from Victoria (Australia)